Rikkyo High School may refer to:
 Rikkyo School (Ikebukuro) (St. Paul's School), a school in Ikebukuro, Toshima, Tokyo, Japan, based on Christian values
 Rikkyo Niiza Junior and Senior High School
 Rikkyo School in England, a Japanese boarding secondary school in Rudgwick, England